The 1986–87 Wills Cup was the sixth edition of the Wills Cup, which was the premiere domestic limited overs cricket competition in Pakistan and afforded List A status. Ten teams participated in the competition which was held from 25 September 1986 to 10 October 1986.

Venues

Group stage

Group A

Points Table

Source:

Group B

Points Table

Source:

Semi-finals

Final

References

National One Day Championship seasons
Wills Cup